The 2019 Prayagraj Ardh Kumbh Mela was the Ardh Kumbh Mela held at Triveni Sangam in Allahabad, Uttar Pradesh, India from 15 January to 4 March 2019.

Governance
A bill was passed in Uttar Pradesh Legislative Assembly to set up Prayagraj Mela Authority, a permanent body to oversee the mela. The divisional commissioner of Allahabad serves its chairperson while the district magistrate and inspector general of police as the vice-chairpersons. Mela officers and other district officials are also the members of this authority.

Projects
Around ₹4200 crore was allotted by the state government for the Ardh Kumbh 2019, over two times more than it had spent on the last Kumbh held in 2013. About 199 projects of 16 government departments were completed under four phases which included a six-lane bridge over the river Ganga and a four-lane railway over-bridge worth ₹275 crore. The Public Works Department executed projects worth ₹430 crore including building an inner ring road in the city. ₹210 crore was spent on safe drinking water facilities and ₹60 crore to electrify the Kumbh area. Focus was also laid on solid waste management to ensure that Ganga water is not contaminated and putting up LED lights. Moreover, widening and beautification of 18 roads and 25 road crossings was completed before the deadline of October 2018.

Promotion
The logo of 2019 Kumbh shows a group of Sadhus bathing in the Sangam confluence of the Ganga and the Yamuna. The Uttar Pradesh government has decreed that all state government documents, letterheads and publicity material, including advertisements and hoardings, should carry the new logo. Moreover, cinema halls in the state are directed to display the logo straight after the national anthem is played.

See also
Prayag Kumbh Mela

References

Further reading
	Kumbh Mela and The Sadhus,(English, Paperback, Badri Narain and Kedar Narain) Pilgrims Publishings, India, 
   कुम्भ मेला और साधु समागम- अमरत्व की खोज : बद्री नारायण एवं केदार नारायण, पिल्ग्रिम्स पब्लिशिंग्स, (भारत)  2010,

External links
 Official Website
 Kumbh Mela 2019 in Prayagraj: documentary photo of the largest religious gathering in the world. 

2019 festivals
2019 in India
Allahabad
Fairs in India
February 2019 events in India
January 2019 events in India
Kumbh Mela
March 2019 events in India
Tourism in Uttar Pradesh